Bocanegra ("Black mouth") is a Spanish surname. Notable people with the name include:

Carlos Bocanegra, American soccer player
Daniel Bocanegra, Colombian football player
Francisco González Bocanegra, Mexican poet
Gertrudis Bocanegra, Mexican guerrilla fighter
José María Bocanegra, Mexican politician
Juan Pérez Bocanegra (d. 1645), friar and musician of the viceroyalty of Peru
Raul Bocanegra, American politician
Suzanne Bocanegra, American artist

See also
Boccanegra, Italian surname